Kreis Gnesen is one of several Kreise (English: counties) in the northern administrative district of Bromberg, in the Prussian province of Posen.

History

Geographical features

Table of Standesamter
"Standesamt" is the German name of the local civil registration offices which were established in October 1874 soon after the German Empire was formed. Births, marriages and deaths were recorded.

Table of all communities

External links
(will go here)

Navigation Bar 

This article is part of the project Wikipedia:WikiProject Prussian Kreise. Please refer to the project page, before making changes.

Districts of the Province of Posen